The 2013 Road to the Kentucky Oaks was a points system by which three-year-old fillies qualified for the 2013 Kentucky Oaks. The point system replaced a previous qualifying system which was based on graded stakes earnings. Beholder was the leading qualifier for the 2013 Oaks and finished second in the race to Princess of Sylmar.

Description 
The 2013 Road to the Kentucky Oaks points system was used to determine which three-year-old fillies qualified for the 2013 Kentucky Oaks. It consisted of 35 races: 20 races for the Kentucky Oaks Prep Season and 15 races for the Kentucky Oaks Championship Season. The point system replaced a previous Road to the Kentucky Oaks qualifying system based on graded stakes earnings.

Standings
Beholder was the leading qualifier for the 2013 Oaks, having earned a total of 164 points by winning the Breeders' Cup Juvenile (10 points), Las Virgenes (50 points) and Santa Anita Oaks (100 points), plus a 2nd-place finish in the Santa Ynez (4 points). She would finish second in the Kentucky Oaks race to Princess of Sylmar, who qualified with 50 points.

Qualifying race details

References

Kentucky Oaks
Road to the Kentucky Oaks
Road to the Kentucky Oaks